Hugh Emerson is a former Gaelic footballer for Laois.

He made his debut for Laois in 1992 as an 18-year-old against Meath and starred in a memorable victory that day. With his long hair and powerful frame, he was one of the darlings of the Laois supporters throughout the 1990s.

He won a Leinster Senior Football Championship medal with Laois in 2003, having been persuaded out of his retirement announced in 2001. He also captained Laois to a Leinster Under 21 Football title in 1994.

He also won two Railway Cup medals with Leinster.

With his club, Portarlington, Hugh picked up two Laois Senior Football Championship medals in 1995 and 2001.

External links
 Hogan Stand magazine profile
 Leinster Express interview
 Laois Today Hughie’s hat-trick shocked Derry to their core

1974 births
Living people
Laois inter-county Gaelic footballers
Portarlington Gaelic footballers